Zoya Skobtsova (born 3 July 1934) is a Soviet middle-distance runner. She competed in the women's 800 metres at the 1964 Summer Olympics.

References

1934 births
Living people
Athletes (track and field) at the 1964 Summer Olympics
Soviet female middle-distance runners
Olympic athletes of the Soviet Union
Place of birth missing (living people)